Xihu District is one of ten urban districts of the prefecture-level city of Hangzhou, the capital of Zhejiang Province, East China, named after and containing the West Lake.

The postal code is 310013.

The district government is located at 1 Zheda Road.

Renowned companies such as Nongfu Spring and Ant Financial have their headquarters in the district.

Administrative divisions
Subdistricts:
Beishan Subdistrict (北山街道), Lingyin Subdistrict (灵隐街道), Xixi Subdistrict (西溪街道), Cuiyuan Subdistrict (翠苑街道), Wenxin Subdistrict (文新街道), Gudang Subdistrict (古荡街道), Xihu Subdistrict (西湖街道), Zhuantang Subdistrict (转塘街道), Jiangcun Subdistrict (蒋村街道), Liuxia Subdistrict (留下街道)

Towns:
Shuangpu (双浦镇), Sandun (三墩镇)

References

External links

 Official website of Xihu District Government

Geography of Hangzhou
Districts of Zhejiang